Pana Pappas Merchant (born April 2, 1943) is a Liberal Senator from the Canadian province of Saskatchewan. She has held the position since her appointment to the Senate by Prime Minister Jean Chrétien in 2002.

On January 29, 2014, Liberal Party leader Justin Trudeau announced all Liberal Senators, including Merchant, were removed from the Liberal caucus, and would continue sitting as Independents. The Senators refer to themselves as the Senate Liberal Caucus even though they are no longer members of the parliamentary Liberal caucus.

Pana Merchant was a longtime member of the Board of Directors of The Parliamentary Network, a founding and long term member of the Canadian Race Relations Foundation, and a longtime member of the World Hellenic Inter-Parliamentary Association.

Senator Pana announced her resignation from the Senate on March 31, 2017, approximately a year ahead of her mandatory retirement date.

References

External links
 
 Liberal Senate Forum

1943 births
Living people
Canadian senators from Saskatchewan
Canadian people of Greek descent
Liberal Party of Canada senators
Women members of the Senate of Canada
Women in Saskatchewan politics
Greek emigrants to Canada
21st-century Canadian politicians
21st-century Canadian women politicians